Sarah Gille is a physical oceanographer at Scripps Institution of Oceanography known for her research on the role of the Southern Ocean in the global climate system.

Early life and education 

Gille earned an undergraduate B.S. from Yale University in 1988, and a Ph.D. in 1995 in a Massachusetts Institute of Technology–Woods Hole Oceanographic Institution Joint Program. Her Ph.D. research used satellites to measured spatial and temporal variability in sea surface heights in the Southern Ocean, including modeling of those data. 

After her doctoral work, Gille trained further as a postdoctoral investigator at Scripps Institution of Oceanography and the University of East Anglia.

Career
Gille then accepted a faculty position at the University of California, Irvine. In 2000 she moved back to the University of California, San Diego where, as of this date, she is jointly affiliated with Scripps Institution of Oceanography and the Department of Mechanical and Aerospace Engineering.

Research 
Gille's research centers on the Southern Ocean where she works on air-sea exchange and historical changes in climate in the region. Gille uses floats to study the movement of water masses in the Southern Ocean, and combined data from the 1990s in the Southern Ocean with historical data to identify warming at mid-depths that was concentrated within the Antarctic Circumpolar Current. Gille's research includes measuring winds from space using the QuickSCAT platform, and assimilating tracer and float data from the Southern Ocean into global models.

As of December 2021, Gilles remained a principal investigator of the historically NSF-funded "Diapycnal and Isopycnal Mixing Experiment in the Southern Ocean" (DIMES), a field program of the United States and the United Kingdom to measure isopycnal (horizontal) and diapycnal (vertical) mixing of the waters of  the Southern Ocean, along with studying the tilting isopycnals of the Antarctic Circumpolar Current. "Tilting isopycnals" refer to oceanic water masses with the same density that tilt or slope with depth. In the ocean, the density of water changes due to variations in temperature and salinity, leading to the formation of surfaces of constant density, known as isopycnals. Tilting isopycnals indicate a change in the density structure of the ocean and can have an impact on ocean circulation and the transport of heat, salt, and other properties. As of December 2021, Gilles was also a Process Studies investigator of the Princeton [University] Environmental Institute-based and NSF-funded Southern Ocean Carbon and Climate Observations and Modeling project (SOCCOM), which aims to characterise the Southern Ocean's influence on global climate.

Selected publications

Selected awards and honors 
While in graduate school, Gille received the 1995 Carl-Gustav Rossby Award of the Massachusetts Institute of Technology. In 2000, as a faculty member, she received the Zeldovich Award from the Committee on Space Research and the Russian Academy of Sciences.

In 2021, Gille was recipient of the Sverdrup Gold Medal of the American Meteorological Society.

Gille was named a Fellow of the American Geophysical Union (AGU) in 2015, and of the American Meteorological Society in 2021. The 2015 AGU announcement cited her "for exceptional contributions to advancing the understanding of the dynamics of the Southern Ocean and its role in the climate system".

Further reading
  Prof. Bindoff, Physical Oceanography, University of Tasmania and a Chief Investigator, ARC Centre of Excellence in Climate System Science, comments that the Swart et al. (2018) study estimates the relative importance of the various factors factor contributing to Southern Ocean change, and that it is the first to do so.
  Mr Freedman presents a popular account of the Swart et al. (2018) study, providing comments by Gille, and independent comments from non-participant Bindoff (see above).

References

External links 

, August 24, 2020 interview with Gille on University of California Television
, February 7, 2020

Fellows of the American Geophysical Union
Yale University alumni
Scripps Institution of Oceanography faculty
Massachusetts Institute of Technology alumni
University of California, San Diego faculty
Women oceanographers
Physical oceanographers
American climatologists
Year of birth missing (living people)
Living people